Stephen Schenkel (September 25, 1934 - December 14, 2009) was an American TV producer and network executive. Schenkel produced a number of soap opera programs; in particular he is known for his production of All My Children for which he was Executive Producer, Another World, and The Edge of Night.

Early life and education
Schenkel was a graduate of Columbia University, class of 1956.

Career
Schenkel served as an executive at NBC, CBS, ABC and Benton & Bowles. He developed and produced variety, mini-series, and game shows programs as well as Discovery Channel documentaries. He was also co-creator and creative consultant on "Ryan's Hope" and ABC After School Specials.

Schenkel was hired as a producer on the daytime serial Another World in 1985; he then became executive producer of All My Children in 1987, but resigned in 1989 because of ill health.

Personal

Schenkel married Penny Bergman in 1990 after meeting her on the set of "All My Children."  He died December 14, 2009.

References

External links
http://www.igs.net/~awhp/credits.html

1934 births
2009 deaths
Columbia College (New York) alumni
American producers
American Broadcasting Company executives
NBCUniversal people